1998 L.League Cup Final was the 3rd final of the L.League Cup competition. The final was played at Nihondaira Sports Stadium in Shizuoka on April 12, 1998. Prima Ham FC Kunoichi won the championship.

Overview
Defending champion Prima Ham FC Kunoichi won their 2nd title, by defeating Matsushita Electric Panasonic Bambina 2–1. Prima Ham FC Kunoichi won the title for 2 years in a row.

Match details

See also
1998 L.League Cup

References

Nadeshiko League Cup
1998 in Japanese women's football